Soumya Swaminathan may refer to:

 Soumya Swaminathan (chess player)
 Soumya Swaminathan (scientist)